Cathal mac Davok Ó Con Ceanainn, (died 1370) was King of Uí Díarmata.

Overview
Cathal is the only ruler of the territory mentioned after Aodh Ó Con Ceanainn. The Annals of the Four Masters simply list his death without giving any details.

References

 The Tribes and Customs of Hy-Many, John O'Donovan, 1843
 The Parish of Ballinasloe, Fr. Jerome A. Fahey.
 The Great Book of Irish Genealogies, 239.11, 244.2, pp. 556–557, volume one, Dubhaltach MacFhirbhisigh; edited, with translation and indices by Nollaig Ó Muraíle, 2003-2004. .
 https://www.webcitation.org/query?url=http://www.geocities.com/Athens/Aegean/2444/irish/LD.htm&date=2009-10-25+05:47:51
 Vol. 2 (AD 903–1171): edition and translation
 Annals of Ulster at CELT: Corpus of Electronic Texts at University College Cork
 Annals of Tigernach at CELT: Corpus of Electronic Texts at University College Cork
Revised edition of McCarthy's synchronisms at Trinity College Dublin.

People from County Galway
14th-century Irish monarchs
1370 deaths
Year of birth unknown